Mae Hong Son may refer to
the town Mae Hong Son
Mae Hong Son Province
Mae Hong Son district
Mae Hong Son Airport